The 1951 Londonderry by-election was held on 19 May 1951 when the incumbent Ulster Unionist Party MP, Ronald Deane Ross was appointed as the Northern Ireland Government Agent in London.  The Ulster Unionist candidate William Wellwood was elected unopposed.  He retained the seat unopposed at the 1951 United Kingdom general election.

References

By-elections to the Parliament of the United Kingdom in County Londonderry constituencies
Unopposed by-elections to the Parliament of the United Kingdom in Northern Irish constituencies
1951 elections in the United Kingdom
20th century in County Londonderry
May 1951 events in the United Kingdom
1951 elections in Northern Ireland